The 2019 Limerick Premier Intermediate Hurling Championship was the sixth staging of the Limerick Premier Intermediate Hurling Championship since its establishment by the Limerick County Board in 2014.

On 26 October 2019, Blackrock won the championship after a 1-18 to 0-16 defeat of Kildimo/Pallaskenry in a final replay at the Gaelic Grounds. It was their first ever championship title in this grade.

Results

Finals

References

External links

 Limerick GAA website

Limerick Premier Intermediate Hurling Championship
Limerick Premier Intermediate Hurling Championship